The 1929–30 Panhellenic Championship was the second season of the highest football league of Greece. It was held with the participation of 3 teams, the champions of the founding Associations of the HFF, Athens, Piraeus and Macedonia, in which Panathinaikos, Olympiacos and Aris respectively finished first. Panathinaikos emerged champion for its first time, undefeated, which among other things on June 1, 1930, achieved the historic 8–2 victory over Olympiacos, which is the widest victory in a match between the two eternal opponents.

The point system was: Win: 2 points - Draw: 1 point - Loss: 0 points.

Qualification round

Athens Football Clubs Association

Piraeus Football Clubs Association

Macedonia Football Clubs Association

Final round

League table

Matches

Top scorers

External links
Rsssf 1929–30 championship

Panhellenic Championship seasons
Greece
1929–30 in Greek football